Azarias is a given name. Notable people with the name include:

 Brother Azarias, Irish-American educator, essayist and littérateur
 Azarias Friton, Roman Catholic prelate
 Azarías Pallais, Nicaraguan poet
 Azarias Ruberwa, Congolese politician, lawyer, and public figure

Other 
 The Prayer of Azariah and Song of the Three Holy Children, also named Prayer of Azarias

See also 
 Luka Azariashvili

 Azaria (disambiguation)
 Azariah (disambiguation)
 Azarian (surname)
 Azaryan (surname)